Santa Maria de Roses is a ruined Benedictine monastery in the municipality of Roses, Alt Empordà comarca, Catalonia, Spain. It is situated within the Ciutadella de Roses, a fortification in the Province of Girona. It is the earliest known example of Lombard architectural style in the country.

History
The origin of this monastery is in a church, Santa Maria de Rodes, belonging to the Monastery of Sant Pere de Rodes. The monastic activity was affected repeatedly by attacks from Saracen pirates. In 960, the monastic community received protection Gausfred I, Count of Ampurias and Roussillon. In 976, it received fishing rights as well as shipwreck rights in local waters and for various goods. A foundation charter dates to 1022. There were several subsidiaries such as Santa Maria de Pedardell and Santa Maria del Camp.

The monastery began to decline in the 15th century. In 1588, because of a plague epidemic, the monastic houses were abandoned and the monastery was looted. In 1592, by papal order, it was joined to the monastery of Santa Maria d'Amer. In 1792, it was abandoned by the monks and in 1793, Napoleon's troops destroyed the building. A restoration occurred in 1966-69.

Architecture

Constructed in a basilica plan, it has three naves with a transept and three apses. There is a barrel vault in the nave. Lombard decoration of the interior walls is still visible. There is a series of blind arches. They are also remnants of a cloister and some monastic buildings. A restoration project began in the late 20th century.

Abbots

References

Bibliography

J. Badia i Homs, L'arquitectura medieval a l'Empordà, 2a ed., 2 vols., Girona, Diputació Provincial de Girona, 1985, vol. II-B, pp. 224–236, 246-247, 253-257 [il.], 605 i 607-612.
G. Barraquer i Roviralta, Las casas de religosos en Cataluña durante el primer tercio del siglo XIX, 2 vols., Barcelona, Impr. F. J. Altés, 1906, vol. 1, pp. 72–76.
Catalunya Romànica, 27 vols., Barcelona, Enciclopèdia Catalana, 1984-1998, vol. 9.
J. M. Marquès i Planagumà, El cartoral de Santa Maria de Roses (segles X-XIII), Barcelona, Institut d'Estudis Catalans, 1986.
F. Monsalvatje i Fossas, Los monasterios de la diócesis gerundense: rectificación á los abaciologios publicados por Jaime Villanueva en su Viaje literario á las iglesias de España, dins Noticias históricas, vol. 14, Olot, Impr. J. Bonet, 1904, pp. 53–67.
M. Oliva Prat, Arquitectura románica ampurdanesa. Santa María de Roses (Gerona): su obra de restauración, primeros trabajos, Revista de Gerona, 61 (1972) i 63 (1973).
Hug Palou i Miquel, El temple de Santa Maria de Roses: noves aportacions als primers documents, Annals de l'Institut d'Estudis Empordanesos, 24 (1991), 31-54.
M. Pujol i Hamelink, La vila de Roses (segles XIV-XVI): aproximació a l'urbanisme, la societat i l'economia a partir dels capbreus del monestir de Santa Maria de Roses (1304-1565), Figueres, Brau, 1997.
Jaume Villanueva, Viage literario a las iglesias de España, vol. 14, Madrid, Real Academia de la Historia, 1850, pp. 233–239.
E. Zaragoza Pascual, Catàleg dels monestirs catalans, Barcelona, Publicacions de l'Abadia de Montserrat, 1997, pp. 195–196.

External links

 Monestir de Santa Maria de Roses - Monestirs de Catalunya 

Benedictine monasteries in Catalonia
Christian monasteries established in the 10th century
Buildings and structures in the Province of Girona